Trouhans is a commune in the Côte-d'Or department in eastern France. It is located on the Ouche river, about 35 km south east of Dijon.

Population

See also
Communes of the Côte-d'Or department

References

Communes of Côte-d'Or